Habtom Samuel (born 30 November 2003) is an Eritrean long-distance runner. He won a bronze medal in the 3000 metres at the 2021 World Athletics U20 Championships and in the 5000 metres at the 2022 World Athletics U20 Championships. He placed 17th in both the 10,000 metres at the 2022 World Athletics Championships and the senior race at the 2023 World Athletics Cross Country Championships.

References

2003 births
Living people
Eritrean male long-distance runners